Liaoning University of International Business and Economics is a university located in Lushunkou District, Dalian City, Liaoning Province, the People's Republic of China.

Address: No. 33, Shunle Street, Lushun Economic Development Zone, Dalian City, Liaoning Province 116052

See also
 University of International Business and Economics, Beijing

References

External links
 Official Web Site

Universities and colleges in Dalian
Business schools in China